Soyuz 7K-L1 No.5L, sometimes identified by NASA as Zond 1967B, was a Soviet spacecraft which was launched in 1967 as part of the Zond programme. It was a  Soyuz 7K-L1 spacecraft, the second of nine to be launched. It was intended to perform a circumlunar flyby of the Moon before returning to the Earth for landing, but failed to achieve Earth orbit.

Soyuz 7K-L1 No.5L was launched at 19:07:59 UTC on 22 November 1967 atop a Proton-K 8K78K carrier rocket with a Blok D upper stage, flying from Site 81/24 at the Baikonur Cosmodrome. One of the rocket's second stage engines failed to ignite, which caused the launch to be aborted and the spacecraft to separate by means of its SAS launch escape system. The descent module came down  downrange. Its landing motors fired prematurely, resulting in a harder landing than expected, and the spacecraft was subsequently dragged  by its parachute. It was subsequently collected by a Mil Mi-4 helicopter. Prior to the release of information about its mission, NASA correctly identified that it had been a test of a spacecraft intended for manned Lunar flights. However, they were unsure whether it was intended to reach the Moon itself.

References

Spacecraft launched in 1967
Zond program